E. giganteum may refer to:
 Equisetum giganteum, a horsetail species native to South America and Central America
 Eriogonum giganteum, the St. Catherine's lace, a wild buckwheat shrub species
 Eryngium giganteum, a plant species

See also
 Giganteum